Azeez Mohamed Mubarak (born 4 July 1951) is a Sri Lankan scientist and researcher. He was the Director/CEO of Industrial Technology Institute (formerly CISIR) from 2002 to 2012. He currently serves as the Chief of Research and Innovation at Sri Lanka Institute of Nanotechnology.

Born to a large family, he received his primary education at Greenland College and secondary education at the Royal College, Colombo. In 1971 he entered the University of Ceylon, Colombo graduated with a BSc first class Honours Degree in Chemistry. During his time at the university he captained the university cricket, soccer, tennis and was a member of the hockey and badminton teams.

Briefly playing cricket for the Moors Sports Club, he won the Commonwealth Scholarship to do his PhD at the University of Cambridge from 1976 to 1980. There he played First-class cricket for the Cambridge University cricket team and won blues for cricket. After gaining his PhD he went on to the University of Maryland for postgraduate research.

He is a Rotarian and a Past President of the Colombo South Rotary Club. He is married to Chitranganie (née Silva), present Chairperson of Information and Communication Technology Agency (ICTA) and has a son and daughter. His son Jehan Mubarak has played cricket for Sri Lanka in all formats of the game. His daughter Kamakshi is currently attached to the World Bank in Washington DC.

References

External links
Aziz Mubarak at ESPNcricinfo

1951 births
Alumni of Royal College, Colombo
Alumni of the University of Ceylon (Colombo)
Alumni of the University of Cambridge
Living people
Sri Lankan Moor scientists
University of Maryland, College Park faculty
Cambridge University cricketers
Sri Lankan cricketers
British Universities cricketers
Sri Lankan expatriates in the United Kingdom